Frya may be
a Frisian goddess described in the 19th-century  Oera Linda Book
an alternative spelling of the name of the historical goddess Frijjo